While We're At It is the tenth studio album from Boston ska punk band The Mighty Mighty Bosstones, released on June 15, 2018 on Big Rig Records. It marks the band's first studio album in seven years and is the final part of a musical trilogy that began with Pin Points and Gin Joints in 2009 followed by The Magic of Youth in 2011.

Lead vocalist Dicky Barrett said the songs on the album were inspired by the current climate in politics and it was a driving force behind its poignant and at times, heated sound: “It feels like unhinged hatred. And the wheels are coming off, but not fast enough for me. For me the whole thing is just lies on top of hatred on top of really stupid thinking. So yes, all that is going to get into the music. It has to.”

Track listing
 "Green Bay, Wisconsin"
 "The Constant" 
 "Wonderful Day For the Race"
 "Unified"
 "Divide" 
 "Closer to Nowhere"
 "Walked Like a Ghost"
 "The West Ends"
 "Here We Are"
 "The Mad Dash"
 "Absolutely Wrong"
 "In Honor Of"
 "Hugo's Wife"
 "After the Music Is Over" 
 "He Kept Mum" †

† available only on the vinyl edition of the album.

Personnel
The Mighty Mighty Bosstones
 Dicky Barrett – lead vocals
 Lawrence Katz – guitar, backing vocals 
 Joe Gittleman – bass, backing vocals 
 Joe Sirois – drums
 Tim "Johnny Vegas" Burton – saxophone
 John Goetchius – keyboards
 Chris Rhodes – trombone
 Leon Silva - saxophone, backing vocals
 Ben Carr – Bosstone, backing vocals

References

2018 albums
The Mighty Mighty Bosstones albums